Karakaralong Islands is a group of seismically active islands in Indonesia closest to Mindanao, Philippines.  To the immediate south are the Sangihe Islands.

Archipelagoes of Indonesia